Pink Luv (stylized as Pink LUV) is the fifth EP by South Korean girl group Apink, released on November 24, 2014. The album's lead single is the title track "Luv".

Release and promotion
The EP Pink Luv was released on November 24. It debuted at number 1 on South Korea's Gaon Album Chart while "Luv" debuted at number 2 on the Gaon Digital Chart and stayed there for two weeks. The song sold 1,490,824 copies and scored Apink's first three triple crown wins in the three major music shows (MTV The Show, Music Core and Inkigayo.) They were the first girl group to achieve this.

Apink performed a snippet of "Secret", a track on their album, in addition to a full performance of "Luv" on KBS's Music Bank on November 21. This was followed by additional comebacks on music programs including MBC's Show! Music Core, SBS's Inkigayo , SBS's The Show, MBC Music's Show Champion and Mnet's M! Countdown. Apink received 17 trophies in total on the aforementioned music shows with "Luv", which is still the highest number of wins for a single song for a girl group.

Track listing

Charts

Album

Single

Sales and certifications

Sales and certifications

Music program wins

Release history

References

External links
 

Apink albums
2014 EPs
Dance-pop EPs
Korean-language EPs
Cube Entertainment EPs
Kakao M EPs